Shostakovich v. Twentieth Century-Fox Film Corp., 80 N.Y.S.2d 575 (N.Y. Sup. Ct. 1948), aff'd, 87 N.Y.S.2d 430 (N.Y. App. Div. 1949), was a copyright lawsuit, in which Russian composer Dmitry Shostakovich unsuccessfully sued a film's distributor, Twentieth Century-Fox Film Corporation, in New York court, for using musical works of his that had fallen into the public domain.

In The Iron Curtain, a 1948 motion picture depicting Soviet espionage in Canada, Twentieth Century Fox used compositions by composers, who were citizens and residents of the Soviet Union as background music, and on the film credited these composers with the compositions. The name of one of the composers, Shostakovich, was also used in the picture when one of its characters incidentally referred to him in an appreciative manner. All of the music used was in the public domain and had no copyright protection, therefore the court refused to enjoin the use of the names and the music.

The court found that the use of the composers' names in conjunction with the compositions is not subject to restraint under the New York State civil rights law (§ 51). In the absence of copyright, others may use the names of the authors in copyrighting, publishing or compiling their works.

Assuming that the publication of defamatory matter may be enjoined, there was no showing that the composers had been slandered or libeled. There was furthermore no indication in the motion picture that the composers participated in or gave their approval or endorsement to the picture, nor was their approval of it "necessarily implied" therein. No such implication exists, necessarily or otherwise, where the work of the composer is in the public domain and may be freely published, copied or compiled by others.

The case foreshadowed Dastar v. Twentieth Century Fox over fifty years later.

(Source: public domain court decision.)

United States copyright case law
New York (state) state case law
1949 in United States case law
Soviet Union–United States relations
1949 in New York (state)
20th Century Fox litigation
Law articles needing an infobox
Dmitri Shostakovich